Roger Fornas Lladó (born October 24, 1982 in Barcelona) is a Spanish professional basketball player. He last played for CB Vic of the LEB Plata.

Career 
After playing in the youth teams of Joventut Badalona and Baloncesto León, on October Fornas debuted in Liga ACB with Caprabo Lleida. He only played 37 seconds.

At the moment, he spent all his career in LEB Oro and LEB Plata leagues, achieving the title with CB Valladolid in 2009.

Honours 

Plus Pujol Lleida

LEB Catalan League Champion: 1
2008

CB Valladolid

LEB Oro Champion: 1
2009

References

External links
ACB profile
FEB profile

1982 births
Living people
BC Andorra players
CB Miraflores players
CB Tarragona players
Liga ACB players
Power forwards (basketball)
Spanish men's basketball players
Basketball players from Barcelona
Palencia Baloncesto players
CB Valladolid players
CB L'Hospitalet players
Spanish expatriate basketball people in Andorra